Kiryat Sanz may refer to:

Kiryat Sanz, Jerusalem, a neighborhood in northern Jerusalem, Israel
Kiryat Sanz, Netanya, a neighborhood in northwestern Netanya, Israel, and the world center for Sanz Hasidism